The 1986–87 Missouri Tigers men's basketball team represented the University of Missouri as a member of the Big Eight Conference during the 1986–87 NCAA men's basketball season. Led by head coach Norm Stewart, the Tigers won Big Eight regular season and tournament titles, and were the No. 4 seed in the Midwest region of the NCAA tournament. The Tigers were upset by Xavier, 70–69, in the opening round and finished with an overall record of 24–10 (11–3 Big Eight).

Roster

Schedule and results

 
|-
!colspan=9 style=| Regular season

|-
!colspan=9 style=| Big Eight Conference tournament

|-
!colspan=9 style=| NCAA tournament

Rankings

References

Missouri
Missouri
Missouri Tigers men's basketball seasons